Lake Rhoda is a natural lake in the town of Lakeside, Colorado, located between Interstate 70 and West 44th Avenue. Originally named West Berkeley Lake, it was renamed for Rhoda Krasner by her father, Ben Krasner, who rescued Lakeside Amusement Park from bankruptcy during the Great Depression.

References

Bodies of water of Jefferson County, Colorado
Rhoda